Phatthana Syvilay (born 4 October 1990) is a Laotian football player who plays for Yotha in Lao League. He is a member of Laos national football team.

International goals

References 

1990 births
Living people
Laotian footballers
Laos international footballers
Yotha F.C. players
Place of birth missing (living people)

Association footballers not categorized by position